Mehdi Boudar (born March 2, 1980 in Annaba) is an Algerian footballer. He currently plays for USM Annaba in the Algerian Ligue Professionnelle 2.

Club career
In the summer of 2010, Boudar signed a two-year contract with JSM Béjaïa, joining them on a free transfer from USM Annaba.

International career
On April 16, 2008, Boudar was called up to the Algerian A' National Team for a 2009 African Nations Championship qualifier against Morocco. He made his international debut as a substitute in the 86th minute of the return leg in Fes.

References

External links
 DZFoot Profile
 

1980 births
Algerian footballers
Algeria A' international footballers
Algerian Ligue Professionnelle 1 players
Algerian Ligue 2 players
JSM Béjaïa players
Living people
People from Annaba
USM Annaba players
AS Khroub players
Competitors at the 2001 Mediterranean Games
Association football midfielders
Mediterranean Games competitors for Algeria
21st-century Algerian people